Chelostomoides   is a subgenus of bees in genus Megachile (leaf-cutter and resin bees). These bees do not cut leaves, but rather, use resin, mud, or other materials

Species

 Megachile abacula
 Megachile adelphodonta
 Megachile alucaba
 Megachile angelarum
 Megachile armaticeps
 Megachile asymmetrica
 Megachile axyx
 Megachile bipartita
 Megachile browni
 Megachile campanulae
 Megachile cartagenensis
 Megachile chilopsidis
 Megachile davidsoni
 Megachile discorhina
 Megachile ecplectica
 Megachile exilis
 Megachile georgica
 Megachile haematoxylonae
 Megachile izucara
 Megachile jamaicae
 Megachile lobatifrons
 Megachile manni
 Megachile occidentalis
 Megachile odontostoma
 Megachile otomita
 Megachile peruviana
 Megachile prosopidis
 Megachile quadridentata
 Megachile rawi
 Megachile reflexa
 Megachile rugifrons
 Megachile spinotulata
 Megachile subexilis
 Megachile texensis

References

Megachile
Insect subgenera